Elections were held in the state of Western Australia on 22 March 1924 to elect all 50 members to the Legislative Assembly. The incumbent Nationalist-Majority Country government, led by Premier James Mitchell, was defeated by the Labor Party opposition, led by Opposition Leader Philip Collier.

Results 

|}

 189,869 electors were enrolled to vote at the election, but 12 of the 50 seats were uncontested, with 30,513 electors enrolled in those seats. Of these, 11 were held by Labor and 1 was held by the Nationalists.

 The Country Party had split in 1923 into Majority and Executive factions. The Majority faction supported the Nationalist party government, while the Executive faction sought a more independent way for the party.

See also
 Members of the Western Australian Legislative Assembly, 1921–1924
 Members of the Western Australian Legislative Assembly, 1924–1927
 First Collier Ministry

References

Elections in Western Australia
1924 elections in Australia
1920s in Western Australia
March 1924 events